La Fiesta may refer to:

 La Fiesta (supermarket), an American store chain in Greater San Antonio, Texas, operated by Foodarama
 La Fiesta Mall, a defunct shopping center in San Roque, Northern Mariana Island
La Fiesta (film), a 1988 Paraguayan short film
 "La Fiesta", a jazz composition by Chick Corea from Return to Forever
 "La Fiesta", a 2014 song by Diana Haddad

See also
 "A la fiesta", a 2000 song by Miranda
 Fiesta (disambiguation)